Raniganj is one of the 243 constituencies of the Bihar Legislative Assembly.

Overview
Raniganj is a town  in Araria district of Bihar. It is having 32 Panchayats. It is one of the largest blocks in Araria District. As per Delimitation of Parliamentary and Assembly constituencies Order, 2008, No 47  Raniganj Assembly constituency is composed of the following: Raniganj community development block; Birnagar East, Birnagar West, Dhaneshwari, Haripur Kala, Khutha Baijnathpur, Naya Bhargama and Vishaharia gram panchayats of Bhargama CD Block.

Raniganj Assembly constituency is part of No 9 Araria (Lok Sabha constituency).

Members of Legislative Assembly

Election results

1977-2010
In November 2010, October 2005 and February 2005 state assembly elections, Parmanand Rishideo of BJP won the Raniganj, Araraia seat defeating his nearest rivals Shanti Devi of RJD in November 2010 and October 2005, and Ashok Paswan of LJP in February 2005. Contests in most years were multi cornered but only winners and runners up are being mentioned. Yamuna Prasad Ram of RJD defeated Ramji Das Rishideo of BJP in 2000. Shanti Devi of JD defeated Yamuna Prasad Ram of Congress in 1995 and 1990. Yamuna Prasad Ram of Congress defeated Bundel Paswan of JP in 1985 and Sukhdeo Paswan of Janata Party (Secular – Charan Singh) in 1980. Adhik Lal Paswan of JP defeated Bundel Paswan of Congress in 1977.

2015
In the 2015 Bihar Assembly Elections, Achmit Rishidev of JDU defeated Ramji Das Rishidev of BJP.

2020

References

External links
 

Assembly constituencies of Bihar
Politics of Araria district